Hervé Brouhon (18 June 1924 – 10 April 1993) was a Belgian politician for the Belgian Socialist Party.

Brouhon was born in Etterbeek. He became a teacher, he was first elected as a municipal councillor in Brussels in 1950 and became its first socialist mayor from 1983 to 1993. He had also been member of the Belgian Chamber of Representatives from 1958 to 1985, and briefly Minister for Social Welfare in 1965–1966. Brouhon died in Anderlecht in 1993.

1924 births
1993 deaths
Mayors of the City of Brussels
Members of the Chamber of Representatives (Belgium)